Malleolar artery may refer to:

 Anterior lateral malleolar artery
 Anterior medial malleolar artery